Johan Martinez-Khalilian is an American actor and public speaker.

Khalilian grew up in Humboldt Park, Chicago. In 2005 he was featured on the cover of RedEye magazine, a youth-oriented  weekly published by the Chicago Tribune. He has appeared on TV and radio shows, including The Tyra Banks Show and the Today Show. He works  as a youth motivational speaker. He has written for Verily Magazine and Disfunkshion Magazine.

Filmography

Film

Television

Music video

References

External links
 
 

Living people
American male television actors
Male actors from Chicago
21st-century American male actors
American male film actors
Year of birth missing (living people)